Belal Luai Abdul Daim (born 1 June 1983), commonly known as Belal Abduldaim, is a Syrian footballer who plays for Sur SC in Oman Professional League.

Career

Club career
Abduldaim's career began in the youth system of Al-Karamah before starting his professional career with the senior team. He won with Al-Karamah four Syrian Premier League titles, four Syrian Cups, one Super Cup and helped the club reach the final of the AFC Champions League for the first time. Al-Karamah were defeated 3–2 on aggregate in the final by Jeonbuk Hyundai Motors of the K-League. Three years later, he played an important role in his side's first-ever accession to AFC Cup Final. Al-Karamah were defeated 2–1 in the final of the second most important association cup in Asia by Kuwait SC of the Kuwaiti Premier League. On 20 August 2013, he signed a one-year contract with Oman Professional League club Al-Suwaiq Club. On 25 September 2014, he signed a one-year contract with another Oman Professional League club Sur SC.

International career
Abduldaim has been a regular for the Syria national football team since 2008. Senior national coach Fajr Ibrahim called him for the first time, and he debuted in a 27 December 2008 friendly against Saudi Arabia. He came on as a substitute for Bassel Al Shaar in the second halftime. Abduldaim was selected to Valeriu Tiţa's 23-man final squad for the 2011 AFC Asian Cup in Qatar. He played in all Syria's three group games against Saudi Arabia, Japan and Jordan.

Club career statistics

Honours

Club
With Al-Karamah
Syrian Premier League (4) : 2005-06, 2006–07, 2007–08, 2008–09
Syrian Cup (4) : 2007, 2008, 2009, 2010
Syrian Super Cup (1): 2008
AFC Champions League Runner-up: 2006
AFC Cup Runner-up: 2009

References

External links

 
 
 Belal Abduldaim at Goal.com
 
 

1983 births
Living people
Sportspeople from Homs
Syrian footballers
Syria international footballers
Syrian expatriate footballers
Association football defenders
2011 AFC Asian Cup players
Al-Karamah players
Al-Muharraq SC players
Al-Wehdat SC players
Suwaiq Club players
Sur SC players
Oman Professional League players
Expatriate footballers in Bahrain
Syrian expatriate sportspeople in Bahrain
Expatriate footballers in Jordan
Syrian expatriate sportspeople in Jordan
Expatriate footballers in Oman
Syrian expatriate sportspeople in Oman
Syrian Premier League players